Giampaolo Ricci (born September 27, 1991) is an Italian basketball professional player for Olimpia Milano of the Italian Lega Basket Serie A (LBA) and the EuroLeague. He plays at the power forward position. Ricci has also represented the Italian national team in international competition.

Professional career
Ricci started playing for Basket Chieti, moving in 2009 to Stella Azzurra Roma and then to Assigeco Casalpusterlengo until 2015. In the season 2014/2015 he performed 11.2 ppg and 5.5 rpg in 26 games In 2016 he moved to Scaligera Basket Verona scoring 6 points and 3.8 rebounds of average and winning the price "Scaligero d'oro" as the most appreciated player of the year for the Scaligera Basket Verona team. He then played in 2016/2017 38 games with Derthona Basket where he performed 9.5ppg, 6.2rpg and 1.7apg in average. Ricci contributed to his team ending the regular season as at the second position in the league. He reaches in 2017 the first Italian category (Serie A) LBA under the guidance of the Italian National team coach Romeo Sacchetti. Ricci won Italian Cup in 2019 with Guerino Vanoli Basket under the guidance of Coach Romeo Sacchetti.

Virtus Bologna (2019–2021)
On June 13, 2019, he has signed with Virtus Bologna of the Italian Lega Basket Serie A (LBA). In September 2020, he was appointed team captain of the club and he won the Italian Championship with Virtus Bologna under the guidance of Sasha Djordjevic.

After having knocked out 3–0 both Basket Treviso in the quarterfinals and New Basket Brindisi in the semifinals, on 11 June 2021 Virtus defeated 4–0 its historic rival Olimpia Milan in the national finals, winning its 16th national title and the first one after twenty years.

Olimpia Milano (2021–present)
On July 6, 2021, Ricci signed a two-year contract with Italian powerhouse Olimpia Milano.

International career
Ricci played for the Italian national team between 2018 and 2021 on eighteen occasions.

Player profile
Ricci is a player with great technical skills and court vision. He is renowned for his 3-point shots (307% shooting in seasons 2020–2021) and his defensive skills made him an appreciated player in the European panorama.

References

External links 

Eurobasket.com Profile
Giampaolo Ricci, legabasket.it

1991 births
Living people
A.S. Stella Azzurra players
Basketball players at the 2020 Summer Olympics
Italian men's basketball players
Lega Basket Serie A players
Olimpia Milano players
Olympic basketball players of Italy
Power forwards (basketball)
Scaligera Basket Verona players
Sportspeople from Chieti
Vanoli Cremona players
Virtus Bologna players